Phanda is a village in Udaipur district in the Indian state of Rajasthan. It is located 10 km towards South from District headquarters Udaipur. As per Population Census 2011, the total population of Phanda is 1005.

References 

Villages in Udaipur district